The 138th New York State Legislature, consisting of the New York State Senate and the New York State Assembly, met from January 6 to April 24, 1915, during the first year of Charles S. Whitman's governorship, in Albany.

Background
Under the provisions of the New York Constitution of 1894, re-apportioned in 1906 and 1907, 51 Senators and 150 assemblymen were elected in single-seat districts; senators for a two-year term, assemblymen for a one-year term. The senatorial districts were made up of entire counties, except New York County (twelve districts), Kings County (eight districts), Erie County (three districts) and Monroe County (two districts). The Assembly districts were made up of contiguous area, all within the same county.

At this time there were two major political parties: the Republican Party and the Democratic Party. Assemblyman William Sulzer, who had been removed from the office of governor in 1913, founded an American Party and ran also on the Prohibition Party ticket for governor. The Independence League, the Progressive Party, the Socialist Party and the Socialist Labor Party also nominated tickets.

Elections
The New York state election, 1914, was held on November 3. D.A. of New York County Charles S. Whitman and Edward Schoeneck were elected Governor and Lieutenant Governor; both Republicans. Of the other seven statewide elective offices, six were carried by Republicans and one by a Democrat. The approximate party strength at this election, as expressed by the vote for governor, was: Republicans 687,000; Democrats 412,000; Independence League 125,000; American 71,000; Prohibition 54,000; Progressives 46,000; Socialists 38,000; and Socialist Labor 2,000.

Also elected were 34 Republicans and 17 Democrats to the State Senate; 99 Republicans, 49 Democrats and two Progressives to the State Assembly; and 168 delegates (15 at-large; and three per senatorial district) to the Constitutional Convention.

Sessions
The Legislature met for the regular session at the State Capitol in Albany on January 6, 1915; and adjourned on April 24.

Thaddeus C. Sweet (R) was re-elected Speaker,

Elon R. Brown (R) was elected Temporary President of the Senate.

On April 6, the Constitutional Convention met at the State Capitol in Albany; and adjourned on September 4. All proposed amendments to the Constitution were rejected by the voters at the state election on November 2, 1915.

State Senate

Districts

Senators
The asterisk (*) denotes members of the previous Legislature who continued in office as members of this Legislature. Charles C. Lockwood, Alvah W. Burlingame Jr., Jimmy Walker, Franklin W. Cristman, Samuel A. Jones, Clinton T. Horton and William P. Greiner changed from the Assembly to the Senate.

Note: For brevity, the chairmanships omit the words "...the Committee on (the)..."

Employees
 Clerk: Ernest A. Fay
 Sergeant-at-Arms: Charles R. Hotaling
 Assistant Sergeant-at-Arms: Samuel Russell
 Principal Doorkeeper: Lee V. Gardner
 First Assistant Doorkeeper: George W. Van Hyning
 Stenographer: John K. Marshall (also Stenographer of the Constitutional Convention)

State Assembly
Note: For brevity, the chairmanships omit the words "...the Committee on (the)..."

Assemblymen

Employees
 Clerk: Fred W. Hammond
 Sergeant-at-Arms: Harry W. Haines (also Sergeant-at-Arms of the Constitutional Convention)
 Principal Doorkeeper: 
 First Assistant Doorkeeper: 
 Second Assistant Doorkeeper: 
 Stenographer:
Postmaster: James H. Underwood

Notes

Sources
 FULL TICKETS OF THE PARTIES in NYT on October 25, 1914
 THE LEGISLATURE RESUMES WORK in The Yonkers Statesman on January 14, 1915
 Journal of the Senate (138th Session) (1915; Vol. I, from January 6 to March 31)
 Journal of the Senate (138th Session) (1915; Vol. II, from March 31 to April 24)
 Laws of the State of New York (138th Session) (1915)
 Documents of the Constitutional Convention of the State of New York 1915 (1915)

138
1915 in New York (state)
1915 U.S. legislative sessions